James Van Eerden (born August 1, 1964) is a cofounder and managing director of Helixx Partners, LLC. He lives on a family homestead outside Greensboro, North Carolina with his wife, Rachel, and their eleven children.

Education
Van Eerden graduated from Marquette University High School in Milwaukee, and then attended Grove City College where he was named a Presidential Scholar. He completed a graduate study certificate at St Peter's College, Oxford, has an MA in philosophy from Trinity, an MBA from Wake Forest University, and is currently a candidate for a Doctorate in Global Education from Gordon–Conwell Theological Seminary. He is a frequent guest lecturer and the Entrepreneur in Residence at Grove City College, where he was named Alumnus of the Year in 2010.

Business
Van Eerden is a cofounder of Helixx Partners, LLC and its affiliated holding companies. He has led the firm’s media and blended value portfolio since 2001. He is a co-founder of Sevenly and other leading social good companies.

Media production
Has been a producer or executive producer for several feature films, including the award-winning documentary films Running the Sahara(with Matt Damon) and War Child.

References

External links
 http://helixxgroup.com

1964 births
Living people
American business executives
Alumni of St Peter's College, Oxford